Moissy-Moulinot is a commune in the Nièvre department in central France, Bourgogne-Franche-Comté.

Geography

The commune is composed of two localities :
 Moissy
 Le Moulinot

Demographics
, the population was 15, making Moissy-Moulinot the least populous commune of Nièvre department.

See also
Communes of the Nièvre department

References

Communes of Nièvre